Wifi Society (Wifi Society – ) is a 2015 Thai television anthology series directed by Nuttapong Mongkolsawas and produced by GMMTV.

The series concluded on 27 September 2015.

Cast and characters

Hunt (BTS) 
 Annop Thongborisut (Por)
 Napasasi Surawan (Mind)

Hunt (Cinema) 
 Anusorn Maneeted (Yong)
 Oranicha Krinchai (Proud)

Hunt (Game Shop) 
 Nattharat Kornkaew (Champ)
 Jiraa Pitakpohntrakul (Guzjung)

Forget to Forget 
 Aungoont Thanasapcharoen (Att)
 Sirimat Chuenwittaya
 Nutnicha Luanganunkun (Dream)

My Bed Friend 
 Sheranut Yusananda (Namcha)
 Daweerit Chullasapya (Pae)

In Relationship 
 Sirisilp Chotvijit
 Pakakanya Charoenyos (Bam)

Grey Secret 
 Peeya Wantayon
 Nawat Phumphotingam (White)
 Korn Khunatipapisiri (Ouajun)

Truth Never Dies 
 Nalinthip Phoemphattharasakun (Fon)
 Pitisak Yaowananon

Be My Dad 
 Rueangrit Siriphanit (Ritz)
 Natthaphat Thiradechpithak
 Alysaya Tsoi (Alice)

Loser Lover 
 Sumonthip Hsu (Gubgib)
 Suwikrom Amaranon (Per)

The Horror Home 
 Pongphan Petchbuntoon (Louis)
 Thanakorn Chinakul (Beau)
 Jumpol Adulkittiporn (Off)

Be Another Me 
 Danupan Yatuam
 Thanapan Yatuam
 Vanyaya Bongkotkan

Behind the Gold Medal 
 Guntee Pitithan (CD)
 Withawin Wiraphong
 Chadatan Dankul

15 Years Later 
 Nachjaree Horvejkul (Cherreen)
 Chanon Santinatornkul (Non)
 Primrata Dejudom (Jaja)
 Akarin Akaranitimaytharatt

Keep in Touch 
 Wichayanee Pearklin (Gam)
 Sunny Burns

Secret Song 
 Sarunchana Apisamaimongkol (Aye)
 Kittisak Patomburana (Jack)
 Khemmika Layluck

Secret in the Paper Plane 
 Lapisara Intarasut (Apple)
 Pumipat Paiboon (Prame)
 Akeburud Sophon (Suice)

Little Light 
 Krissanapoom Pibulsonggram (JJ)
 Poramaporn Jangkamol
 Phulita Supinchompoo (Namwhan)

Another Chance 
 Arita Ramnarong (Chacha)
 Leo Saussay

Net Idol 
 Sakuntala Thianphairot (Tornhom)
 Chatwalit Siritrap

Coming Home 
 Thongpoom Siripipat (Big)
 Vasana Chalakorn

Empty Night 
 Oranicha Krinchai (Proud)
 Pattarapol Kantapoj (Dew)

32-34 
 Linotphita Chindaphu
 Purim Rattanaruangwattana (Pluem)

Oh My Wife 
 Pimchanok Ponlabhun
 Chattarin Kulkalyadee

Just Only You 
 Apinya Sakuljaroensuk (Saipan)
 Vonthongchai Intarawat (Tol)

Because of You 
 Mintita Wattanakul (Mint)
 Nisachol Siwthaisong (Nest)

Close to You 
 Nara Thepnupha
 Jakkarin Phooriphad

References

External links 
 GMMTV

Television series by GMMTV
Thai romance television series
Thai drama television series
2015 Thai television series debuts
2015 Thai television series endings
One 31 original programming